The 2007 Tercera División play-offs to Segunda División B from Tercera División (Promotion play-offs) were the final playoffs for the promotion from 2006–07 Tercera División to 2007–08 Segunda División B. In some groups four teams took part in the play-off while other groups have only three.

The teams highlighted in yellow played the Liguilla de Ascenso to Segunda Division B.
The teams highlighted in red were relegated to Regional Divisions.

Eliminatories
The regular season finish the 27 May 2007.
The play-offs begin the 2 and 3 of June.

Group 1

1st Eliminatory:

2nd Eliminatory:

Promoted to Segunda División B:CF Gavà

Group 2

1st Eliminatory:

2nd Eliminatory:

Promoted to Segunda División B:Lucena CF

Group 3

1st Eliminatory:

2nd Eliminatory:

Promoted to Segunda División B:Girona FC

Group 4

1st Eliminatory:

2nd Eliminatory:

Promoted to Segunda División B:Sabadell

Group 5

1st Eliminatory:

2nd Eliminatory:

Promoted to Segunda División B:UD Fuerteventura

Group 6

1st Eliminatory:

2nd Eliminatory:

Promoted to Segunda División B:Real Betis B

Group 7

1st Eliminatory:

2nd Eliminatory:

Promoted to Segunda División B:CD Dénia

Group 8

1st Eliminatory:

2nd Eliminatory:

Promoted to Segunda División B:CD San Isidro

Group 9

1st Eliminatory:

2nd Eliminatory:

Promoted to Segunda División B:Deportivo B

Group 10

1st Eliminatory:

2nd Eliminatory:

Promoted to Segunda División B:Algeciras CF

Group 11

1st Eliminatory:

2nd Eliminatory:

Promoted to Segunda División B:UB Conquense

Group 12

1st Eliminatory:

2nd Eliminatory:

Promoted to Segunda División B:UD Villa de Santa Brígida

Group 13

1st Eliminatory:

2nd Eliminatory:

Promoted to Segunda División B:Ontinyent CF

Group 14

1st Eliminatory:

2nd Eliminatory:

Promoted to Segunda División B:CD Guadalajara

Group 15

1st Eliminatory:

2nd Eliminatory:

Promoted to Segunda División B:Mazarrón CF

Group 16

1st Eliminatory:

2nd Eliminatory:

Promoted to Segunda División B:SE Eivissa-Ibiza

Group 17

1st Eliminatory:

2nd Eliminatory:

Promoted to Segunda División B:Peña Sport FC

Group 18

1st Eliminatory:

2nd Eliminatory:

Promoted to Segunda División B:Villarreal B

2006-07
play
2007 Spanish football leagues play-offs